Coccothrinax gundlachii (yuraguana) is a palm which is endemic central and eastern Cuba.

Like other members of the genus, C. barbadensis is a fan palm.  Trees are single-stemmed, between 4 and 10 metres tall with stems 7 to 20 centimetres in diameter.  The fruit is purple-black, 1–1.3 cm in diameter.

References

gundlachii
Trees of Cuba
Least concern plants
Plants described in 1939